Kidnapping is a crime in the United States. Throughout its history, a number of incidents have taken place.

Prevalence

Adults
Kidnapping statistics for U.S. adults continue to remain elusive; the crime of kidnapping is not separately recorded by the Uniform Crime Report. In 2010, according to NCIC's Missing Person File, over 69,000 individuals were categorized as "person over the age of 21, not meeting the criteria for entry in any category who is missing and for whom there is a reasonable concern for his/her safety".

The federal government estimated around 70,000 missing persons above the age of 18 cases in 2001.

Children

The vast majority of child abduction cases in the United States are parental kidnapping, where one parent hides, takes or holds a child without the knowledge or consent of another parent or guardian. Depending on the state and the legal status of the family members, this might not be a criminal offense. In 1976, parental kidnappings in the United States stood at 60,000. By 1984, it was between 459,000 and 751,000. In 2010, the US Department of Justice reported 200,000 cases of parental kidnapping; these comprised both domestic and international abductions.

Fewer than 350 people under the age of 21 have been abducted by strangers in the United States per year, on average, between 2010–2017.

The federal government estimated about 50,000 people reported missing in 2001 who were younger than 18. Only about 100 cases per year can be classified as abductions by strangers.

According to the State Department, between 2008 and 2017 an average of about 1,100 children were abducted from the U.S. to a foreign country. In 2017, 345 resulted in the department opening an international kidnapping case.

Law

According to 18 U.S.C. 1201, whoever illegally confines, decoys, kidnaps, abducts, seizes or takes away a person and holds for ransom or prize can be considered as a criminal.

In some instances, it cannot be considered as kidnapping if the person is:
 willingly transported by the parent.
 taken by officers, employees as described in section 1114 as an officer or employee engaged in or on account of the performance of official duties for the United States Government.
 foreign official, an internationally protected person as defined in section 1116, it includes the Chief of State or the political equivalent, President, Vice President, Prime Minister, Ambassador, Foreign Minister, or other officer of Cabinet rank or above of a foreign government, among others.

Kidnapping of a person can be punished by imprisonment up to life. If kidnapping resulted in the death of a person, it can be punished by execution or life imprisonment. Kidnapping someone who is 17 or under is considered child abduction since the United States legally defines a child as someone 17 or under.

The United States is a party to the Hague Convention on the Civil Aspects of International Child Abduction.

The Sean and David Goldman International Child Abduction Prevention and Return Act of 2014 allows the U.S. Secretary of State to sanction countries that do not cooperate with the return of abducted children, and to seek extradition of abducting parents.  The law also set up the Transportation Security Administration's "do not depart" list.

Prevention and response systems

 The Transportation Security Administration maintains a "do not depart" list for children at risk of parental abduction. Judges sitting on custody cases can add children to the list, though it is highly underutilized.
 Amber alerts can be issued to notify the public help locate abducted children and their abductors, typically transmitting a description of the people involved and sometimes a car or license plate number

Notable cases

References